Colin Currie (born 1996) is an Irish hurler who plays for Dublin Senior Championship club Na Fianna and at inter-county level with the Dublin senior hurling team. He usually lines out as a left corner-forward.

Career

A member of the Na Fianna club in Glasnevin, Currie first came to prominence on the inter-county scene as a member of the Dublin minor team that won the 2016 Leinster Championship. He subsequently lined out with the Dublin under-21 team as well as with DCU Dóchas Éireann in the Fitzgibbon Cup. Currie joined the Dublin senior hurling team in 2021, alongside his brother Seán Currie.

Career statistics

Honours

Dublin 
Leinster Minor Hurling Championship: 2016

References

External links
Colin Currie profile at the Dublin GAA website

1998 births
Living people
Na Fianna hurlers
Dublin inter-county hurlers